Leucoptera karsholti is a moth in the family Lyonetiidae. It is found in Morocco.

They probably mine the leaves of their host plant.

External links
Fauna Europaea

Leucoptera (moth)
Moths of Africa
Moths described in 1994